Ulysses Samuel Washington Jr. (July 16, 1920 – October 25, 2018) was an American football coach and long-time educator at Delaware State University.

Biography
Washington attended Virginia State University in Petersburg, Virginia and played on the football team. After that, he earned a master's degree at Rutgers University and began his teaching career as an assistant professor of agriculture education and farm mechanics in 1949 at Delaware State University. In 1950, Washington became an assistant coach for the Hornets football program and served at this capacity through 1964. He spent 1965 and 1966 as the head coach and compiled a record of 7–10–0. Washington returned for one more season to once again serve as an assistant coach.

In 1971, Washington became chair of the Department of Agriculture and Natural Resources, a position which he held until his retirement at the end of the 1990–91 academic year.

Washington was the first person in his family to graduate from college and was the father of Ukee Washington, a television news anchor in Philadelphia, Pennsylvania.

Head coaching record

References

1920 births
2018 deaths
Delaware State Hornets athletic directors
Delaware State Hornets football coaches
Delaware State University faculty
Virginia State Trojans football players
Rutgers University alumni
People from Buckingham County, Virginia
African-American coaches of American football
African-American players of American football
African-American college athletic directors in the United States
20th-century African-American sportspeople
21st-century African-American sportspeople